Pune is a city in Maharashtra, India.

It may also refer to:
 Pune division
 Pune district
 Pune Camp
 Pune railway division
 Pune Junction railway station
 Pune Airport
 Pune F.C.
 Savitribai Phule Pune University
 Pun